The 2018 FIBA European Championship for Small Countries was the 16th edition of this tournament. It was hosted by San Marino.

Teams
Seven teams played in the competition, with the return of Norway, 17 years after their last appearance in a FIBA competition.

Armenia, that participates in the EuroBasket 2021 qualification, and Wales, integrated in the team of Great Britain, were the teams from the previous edition that did not participate in this one.

Venues

Preliminary round
All times are local (UTC+2).

Group A

Group B

Classification group

Final round

Semifinals

Third-place game

Final

Final ranking

References

External links 
 The Championship at FIBA.com
 FIBA Europe website of the European Championship for Small Countries

FIBA European Championship for Small Countries
FIBA European Championship for Small Countries 
FIBA European Championship for Small Countries
International sports competitions hosted by Moldova
Basketball in San Marino
2018 in Moldovan sport
FIBA European Championship
FIBA European Championship